Studio Uno is an album by Italian singer Mina. The songs were all performed during the Saturday TV show Studio Uno.

During the years of her long career, Mina re-recorded most of the songs of this album. In 1965, she covered "Un anno d'amore" in other three languages: in Spanish ("Un año de amor" with lyrics written by Gaby Verlor), in Turkish ("Dön bana") and in Japanese ("Wakare"), plus a second Spanish version in 2007 (lyrics by Pedro Almodóvar) for Todavía, in a duo with the flamenco singer Diego El Cigala. "Tu farai" was recorded in Spanish with the title of "Qué harás", as well as "È l'uomo per me" ("Mi hombre será"), "Città vuota" ("Ciudad solitaria"), "Io sono quel che sono" ("Yo soy la que soy"), "Se piangi, se ridi" ("Si lloras, si ríes") and "Un buco nella sabbia" ("Un hoyo en la arena"). While these last two were also recorded in Japanese (respectively with the titles "Kimi ni namida to hohoemi wo" and "Suna ni kieta namida"),  "Io sono quel che sono" was also sung in Turkish ("Mesvim bahar"). In 1978, Mina made a sort of disco version of "Città vuota", issued on CD only twenty years later for the album compilation Mina Studio Collection. All the other songs were collected, during the 1990s, in unofficial compilation albums, such as España, mi amor..., Mina latina and Mina in the world.

It was reissued on CD by BMG in 1997.

Track listing

Mina (Italian singer) albums
1965 albums
Italian-language albums
Bertelsmann Music Group albums